Radio Beijing Corporation (RBC; , literally Beijing People's Broadcasting Station), was a family of municipal radio stations that also include news, music, and sports in Beijing.

On 1 June 2020, Radio Beijing Corporation, together with Beijing Television and Beiguang Media, merged into Beijing Media Network.

Beijing Radio broadcasts in Beijing on AM, FM, cable FM, digital radio, digital TV and online.

List of Beijing Radio channels 
As of 2021, all of these radio channels are also available via Internet.

former radio channels 

 Beijing Jingji Radio - internet streaming only channel focus on financial, stopped on 1 January 2022
 Beijing Qingmeng Radio - internet streaming only channel focus on Blue Network Broadcast, stopped on 1 January 2022
 Beijing Tongsu Radio - FM 97.0 and internet streaming focus on Popular Music (Mandopop), stopped on 1 January 2022
 Beijing Shenghuo Radio - internet streaming only channel focus on Beijing City Life Broadcast, stopped on 1 January 2022
 Beijing Qingyinyue Radio - internet streaming only channel focus on Light Music Broadcast, stopped on 1 January 2022
 Beijing DAB Radio - internet streaming only channel focus on DAB Broadcast, stopped on 1 January 2022
 Beijing Story Radio - AM 603 kHz & FM 89.1 MHz focus on stories, stopped on 1 January 2023
 Radio Beijing International - AM 774 kHz & FM 92.3 MHz for foreign broadcasting, stopped on 1 January 2023
 Beijing Youth Radio - AM 927 kHz & FM 98.2 MHz for Youths, stopped on 1 January 2023

References

Source: pinyin translated by Cozy Website

External links
 

Culture in Beijing
Mandarin-language radio stations
Radio stations in China
Radio stations established in 1994
Mass media in Beijing
1994 establishments in China